The Cypriot Fourth Division was the fourth tier football league competition in Cyprus, ran by the Cyprus Football Association. Each year, the top finishing teams of the league were promoted to the Cypriot Third Division, and the lowest finishing teams were relegated to the amateur leagues.

History
The Cypriot Fourth Division started the 1985–86 football season as the fourth level of the Cypriot football. The decision was taken by CFA on 23 July 1985.

The first eight seasons the championship was split into three or four geographical groups, representing the Districts of Cyprus. From 1993–94 season until 2014–15 season, the championship was held as a single division. In all seasons, all the teams played against each other twice, once at their home and once away.

The 2014–15 season was the last one ever for the Cypriot Fourth Division, as the league was dissolved and replaced by the STOK Elite Division, which is conducted under the auspices of Confederation of local federations of Cyprus (STOK).

The teams that were relegated from the Cypriot Fourth Division were taking part to the next season's amateur leagues. The teams that were promoted from the Cypriot Fourth Division were taking part to the next season's Cypriot Third Division.

From 1986–87 season until 2007–08 season, the Fourth Division teams were participating in the Cypriot Cup. From 2008–09 season, the Fourth Division teams were not allowed to participate in the Cypriot Cup, but they could take part in the Cypriot Cup for lower divisions (participation in this cup was not compulsory).

Structure
The structure of the championship changed some times during the years. From 1985–86 until 1992–93, the championship was split into three or four geographical groups, depending from Districts of Cyprus each participated team came from. On some occasions, some teams participated in groups that did not correspond to their geographical origin due to the increased number of teams in the group of their geographical origin. In these cases, the teams which would participate in different geographical groups were determined by a draw. Initially, the championship was played in three regional groups: Nicosia-Keryneia group, Limassol-Paphos group, and Larnaca-Famagusta group. In the 1988–89 season, the championship was played in four regional groups.

The championship was held for the first time as a single division in the 1993–94 season. All the teams played against each other twice, once at their home and once away. The team with the most points at the end of the season crowned champions. This was the league's current format until its last season.

Points system
The points system of the Cypriot Fourth Division changed during the years:
 From 1985–86 until 1990–91 season, teams were awarded two points for a win, one point for a draw and zero points for a defeat.
 From 1991–92 until 2014–15 season, teams were awarded three points for a win, one point for a draw and zero points for a defeat.

Winners
The table presents all the winners of the Cypriot Fourth Division from 1985–86 season to 1987–88 season when the championship was split to three geographical groups.

The table presents the winners of the 1988–89 Cypriot Fourth Division when the championship was split to four geographical groups.

The table presents all the winners of the Cypriot Fourth Division from 1989–90 season to 1992–93 season when the championship was split to three geographical groups.

The table presents all the winners of the Cypriot Fourth Division from 1993–94 season to 2014–15 season when the championship was held as a single division.

Performance By club

* Group Champions

Number of participating, promoted and relegated teams per season
The number of the participated teams and the number of the teams that were promoted to the Cypriot Third Division and the teams that were relegated to the amateur leagues changed many times during the years.

Participations per club
130 teams had participated in the Cypriot Fourth Division.

1 The team has one participation as Omonoia Oroklinis and one participation as Alki Oroklini.

See also
 Football in Cyprus
 Cypriot football league system
 Cypriot First Division
 Cypriot Second Division
 Cypriot Third Division
 STOK Elite Division
 Cypriot Cup
 Cypriot Cup for lower divisions

References 

 
4
Defunct fourth level football leagues in Europe